Frontenac Provincial Park is a provincial park located near the town of Sydenham, north of Kingston, Ontario, Canada. This 5,350-hectare park is classified as a natural environment park, and lies on the Frontenac Axis, a topographic extension of the Canadian Shield connecting to the Adirondack Mountains. It features 22 lakes, over 700 species, and extensive areas of mixed forest, wetlands, and granite outcrops.

Located within the Frontenac Arch Biosphere Reserve and the Frontenac Forests Important Bird Area the region is regarded for its biodiversity. Frontenac Provincial Park is home to a native population of grey wolves. Other animals that call the park home include American black bear, red fox, mink, northern river otter, white-tailed deer, porcupine, and fisher.

History 
Frontenac Provincial Park was established in 1974.

Before European settlement, indigenous peoples, mostly Algonquins, lived in the area. Several homesteads were established by European settlers in what is now park area, but the rocky landscape posed challenges for homesteading. Historically, the area supported forestry and mining industries for local communities.

Recreation

Camping, hiking, and paddling 

Arab Lake Gorge Trail is a short,  trail that traverses the Arab Lake Gorge.
It goes from South Otter Lake to Doe Lake and back. A highlight of the trail is the abandoned Kemp Mine.
Slide Lake Loop measures  in length and encircles Slide Lake and parts of Buck Lake.
The Rideau Trail runs through the southern portion of the park.

Education and events 
Wilderness courses are offered to teach wilderness skills in a semi-wilderness setting.

Fishing 
Fishing is permitted within Frontenac Park year-round, and species include lake trout, largemouth and smallmouth bass, northern pike, black crappie, perch, and brook trout. Several lakes are stocked to offer winter ice fishing opportunities.

Winter activities 
Frontenac remains open throughout winter, and offers trails for snowshoeing, cross-county and backcountry skiing, winter camping, and ice fishing.

References

External links

 
 Friends of Frontenac Provincial Park

Provincial parks of Ontario
Protected areas of Frontenac County
Protected areas established in 1974
1974 establishments in Ontario